is a railway station in Takikawa, Hokkaido, Japan, operated by the Hokkaido Railway Company (JR Hokkaido).

Lines
Takikawa Station is served by the Hakodate Main Line and Nemuro Main Line. The station is numbered "A21".

Station layout

The station consists of three ground level platforms serving five tracks. The station has automated ticket machines, automated turnstiles and a "Midori no Madoguchi" staffed ticket office. The Kitaca farecard cannot be used at this station.

Platforms

History
The station opened on 16 July 1898.  With the privatization of Japanese National Railways (JNR) on 1 April 1987, the station came under the control of JR Hokkaido.

Surrounding area
 Takikawa Bus Terminal
 National Route 12
 National Route 38
 National Route 451
 Takikawa City Hall
 Takikawa Police Station
 Takikawa Post Office
 Hokkaido Takikawa Nishi High School
 Hokkaido Takikawa High School
 Hokkaido Takikawa Kogyo High School
 Ishikari River

References

External links

 JR Hokkaido station information 

Railway stations in Japan opened in 1898
Railway stations in Hokkaido Prefecture
Takikawa, Hokkaido